William Hughes Hamilton III (March 9, 1924 – February 28, 2012) was a prominent theologian and proponent of the Death of God movement. Hamilton died in 2012 at age 87 in Portland, Oregon.

Education and career
Hamilton was born March 9, 1924, to William Hughes Hamilton II and Helen Hamilton (née Anderson). in Evanston, Illinois. In 1943 Hamilton graduated from Oberlin College. He served in the United States Navy during World War II, then earned a master's degree from Union Theological Seminary in the City of New York in 1949. In 1952 Hamilton received a doctorate in theology from the University of St Andrews in Scotland.

Hamilton and fellow theologian Thomas J. J. Altizer co-authored the book Radical Theology and the Death of God (1966). Time magazine published the article "Is God Dead?" that same year. In 1953 Hamilton joined the faculty at Colgate Rochester Crozer Divinity School until he lost his endowed chair in 1967. He then taught religion at New College in Sarasota, Florida before becoming a faculty member at Portland State University in 1970. There he served as dean of arts and letters until his retirement in 1986.

In 1949 Hamilton married Mary Jean Golden, a dancer from the New York City Ballet. They had five children: Ross, Donald, Catherine, Patrick and Jean. Hamilton died of complications from congestive heart failure in his home on February 28, 2012, at age 87 in Portland, Oregon.

See also

 Christian atheism
 List of Oberlin College alumni
 List of people from Evanston, Illinois
 List of people from Portland, Oregon

References

External links 
 Excerpt from Radical Theology and the Death of God

1924 births
2012 deaths
20th-century American theologians
21st-century American theologians
Alumni of the University of St Andrews
American Christian theologians
American male non-fiction writers
Colgate Rochester Crozer Divinity School faculty
Death of God theologians
Oberlin College alumni
Portland State University faculty
United States Navy personnel of World War II
Writers from Evanston, Illinois
Writers from Portland, Oregon